PyTorch Lightning is an open-source Python library that provides a high-level interface for PyTorch, a popular deep learning framework. It is a lightweight and high-performance framework that organizes PyTorch code to decouple the research from the engineering, making deep learning experiments easier to read and reproduce. It is designed to create scalable deep learning models that can easily run on distributed hardware while keeping the models hardware agnostic.  

In 2019, Lightning was adopted by the NeurIPS Reproducibility Challenge as a standard for submitting PyTorch code to the conference.

In 2022, the PyTorch Lightning library officially became a part of the Lightning framework, an open-source framework managed by the original creators of PyTorch Lightning.

References 

Python (programming language) libraries